The 2000 ANZ Tasmanian International was a women's tennis tournament played on outdoor hard courts at the Hobart International Tennis Centre in Hobart in Australia that was part of Tier IV of the 2000 WTA Tour. It was the seventh edition of the tournament and was held from 9 January until 15 January 2000. Unseeded Kim Clijsters won the singles title and earned $16,000 first-prize money.

Finals

Singles

 Kim Clijsters defeated  Chanda Rubin 2–6, 6–2, 6–2
 It was Clijsters' 1st singles title of the year and the 2nd of her career.

Doubles

 Rita Grande /  Émilie Loit defeated  Kim Clijsters /  Alicia Molik 6–2, 2–6, 6–3

References

External links
 ITF tournament edition details
 Tournament draws

Tasmanian International
Tas
Hobart International